Jacqueline Anne "Jacque" Hinman P.E. LEED (her maiden name is Crenca and used earlier Rast as her surname which was from a previous marriage) is one of a small number of women who have led Fortune 500 companies. She was most recently the chairman, president and CEO of CH2M HILL, a Fortune 500 US engineering company.

Early life and education
Hinman received her bachelor's degree in civil/environmental engineering from Pennsylvania State University College of Engineering in 1983. She also attended the Stanford Executive Program in 2013.  She is a registered professional engineer (P.E.) with accreditation under the US Green Building Council’s Leadership in Energy and Environmental Design (LEED) program.

Career

Pre-CEO Career
In 1988, Hinman joined CH2M HILL in the environmental business. She worked for ten years doing design management, project management, business development, and client group management. In 1997 she became the CEO of management consulting firm Talisman Partners, which was acquired by the Infrastructure Division of Tyco in 2001.  From 2001 until 2004 Hinman was senior vice president of Tyco's Facilities and Infrastructure Business (formerly Earth Tech).  She owned the Azimuth Group from 2004 to 2005, serving as a senior management consultant for the construction and engineering industry.
 
After returning to CH2M HILL in 2006, Hinman was appointed to the board of CH2M HILL Companies, Ltd on May 6, 2008. From 2007 until 2011 she served in multiple Executive Roles for the company, including serving as President of the Facilities and Infrastructure Division, President of the Center for Project Excellence, and Senior VP of Global Business Development. Hinman was especially instrumental in developing the firm's sport program management business, capitalizing on its historic involvement in the sustainability aspects of the Olympics (Atlanta, Sydney, Salt Lake City, Vancouver) and expanding the company's work into infrastructure and overall sport program management for the London and Rio Olympics. Beginning in 2011 Hinman served as President of the International Division of CH2M HILL, and oversaw the acquisition of UK-based Halcrow Group, for which she served as Chairman and CEO until its integration.

CEO of CH2M HILL
Hinman took over as President and CEO in January, 2014. In July 2014 the company announced the appointment of Hinman to be the chairman of the board replacing Lee McIntire who had retired from that position on September 18, 2014.

According to The Denver Post-Business in October 2013, her position was noteworthy, as engineering had traditionally been a field in which men have dominated.  According to Mark Leftly of the UK's The Independent in September 2013, since her rise to the head of CH2M Hill she is “one of the most powerful women in the industry.”

Hinman promoted diversity and inclusion during her tenure as Chairman and CEO, achieving numerous goals not typical of the industry, including a high proportion of women in junior and senior management positions, and the 2020 Women on Boards recognition for board composition of 30% women. Hinman has been a noted reference on improving corporate cultures and diversity. Kornferry: The Breakthrough Formula: Women CEO's

Under Hinman's leadership, CH2M HILL expanded upon its recognition for industry leadership, inclusive culture, and impact on the world.  The company was named by Fortune in 2017 as one of the "Top 50 Companies Changing the World" and as a Forbes "Best Employer for Diversity" and "Best Large Employer".  It was also named as a "World's Most Ethical Company" by Ethisphere for a ninth consecutive year.

Hinman's tenure as CEO also saw the company shift away from fixed price Engineer-Procure-Construct (EPC) contracts.  Years earlier, the company had decided to enter the at-risk construction industry and taken on several EPC projects that proved difficult to perform and strained the balance sheet starting in late 2013. These challenges and the company's lagging growth in its core engineering and consulting business also prompted the CH2M HILL Board to evaluate the company's capital structure in 2014.  In 2015, CH2M HILL modified its historical employee ownership model by bringing on private equity firm Apollo Global Management in 2015 as a minority investor.  During the period 2015-2017, CH2M HILL improved its performance - including sales, project delivery, and profitability - through an increased focus on client and project management, and a shift in operating model. Facing a growing retired employee shareholder base, the CH2M HILL board actively evaluated capital structure change options in 2017 in order to provide sufficient capital to shareholders that desired to sell their stock.  After preparing for an IPO, and evaluating other merger and sales options, CH2M HILL agreed to merge with Jacobs Engineering in August 2017. Hinman retired from CH2M HILL concurrent with the completion of the December 2017 merger.

Board memberships
In November 2017, Hinman joined the board of International Paper, and serves on its Audit and Management Development and Compensation Committees. In April 2019, Hinman was named a Director of the newly formed Dow Inc., after having served on the board of DowDuPont since June 2018.  Hinman serves on the Dow Audit Committee and chairs the Environmental, Health, Safety and Technology Committee.  In December 2019, Hinman joined the board of AECOM, serving on its Strategy, Risk and Safety Committee and its Compensation Committee.   She ended her AECOM board service on March 1, 2022.  Hinman also previously served on the board executive committee of the nonprofit organization Catalyst

See also
List of women CEOs of Fortune 500 companies

References

External links
Official Website

1961 births
American women chief executives
American chief executives of Fortune 500 companies
Penn State College of Engineering alumni
21st-century American businesspeople
Living people
People from Maryland
Directors of Dow Inc.
21st-century American businesswomen